Follmer, Clogg and Company Umbrella Factory, also known as Van Sciver Building, is a historic factory building located at Lancaster, Lancaster County, Pennsylvania. It was built between about 1880 and 1905, and is a "U"-shaped, brick complex measuring approximately 144 feet by 250 feet.  It housed Follmer, Clogg and Company, a manufacturer of umbrellas and parachutes, until the 1940s. In 1944, it was acquired by the Van Sciver Furniture Company and housed a furniture store, warehouse, and repair shop until 1982.

It was listed on the National Register of Historic Places in 1986.

References

Industrial buildings and structures on the National Register of Historic Places in Pennsylvania
Industrial buildings completed in 1905
Buildings and structures in Lancaster, Pennsylvania
National Register of Historic Places in Lancaster, Pennsylvania
1905 establishments in Pennsylvania